Keith Scribner is an American novelist, short-story writer, screenwriter, essayist, and educator.  His third novel, The Oregon Experiment, was published by Alfred A. Knopf (Random House) in June 2011.

He is a professor of English at Oregon State University, where he teaches in the School of Writing, Literature, and Film.

Scribner received his BA from Vassar College and was a Wallace Stegner Fellow at Stanford University, where he later taught as a Jones Lecturer. He has received fellowships from Oregon State University's Center for the Humanities. His first novel, The GoodLife, was included in the annual New York Times "Notable Books" list for the year 2000, and a Barnes & Noble "Discover Great New Writers" selection.

Books 
 The GoodLife (1999)
 Miracle Girl (2004)
 The Oregon Experiment (2011)
 Old Newgate Road (2019)

References 

Stanford University alumni
20th-century American novelists
21st-century American novelists
American male novelists
American educators
Living people
Year of birth missing (living people)
Vassar College alumni
20th-century American male writers
21st-century American male writers